Nicolaas "Klaas" Bom (born 1937) is a Dutch engineer. He was a professor of medical technology in cardiology at the Erasmus MC. His 1970s research on ultrasound technology provided several new medical devices, including the portable ultrasound scanner.

Career
Bom was born in Velsen in 1937. He studied electrical engineering at Delft University of Technology, writing his dissertation on electromagnetic wave propagation. He subsequently joined the Royal Netherlands Navy, became an officer, and did sonar research in Italy for six years. In 1968 Bom started working at the cardiology department of the Erasmus MC and engaged in diagnostic echo research. Bom continued his studies and in 1972 obtained his PhD on the topic of echocardiography. He subsequently became head of bioengineering of the Thoraxcenter.

Research
In the 1970s Bom worked on diagnostic ultrasound research. By 1971 he had created a machine that was able to produce a full-view cross-section of a working heart. He also created both the first phased array catheter and the first linear array. Together with the company Organon Teknika his department was also responsible for the development of a portable ultrasound machine in 1976, the Minivisor, which did not become a commercial success. Overall his research group was involved in the areas of echo contrast, intravascular echo catheters and diagnostic ultrasounds in general. During this time Bom also constructed five machines that would be able to display two-dimensional echo's and subsequently distributed these machines around hospitals worldwide.

Bom also served for ten years as (co)-director of the ICIN-KNAW, the predecessor to the Dutch Heart Institute. He retired in 2003.

Bom was elected a member of the Royal Netherlands Academy of Arts and Sciences in 1993. He is an honorary member of the Dutch Society for Medical Ultrasound and EFSUMB.

References

1937 births
Living people
Delft University of Technology alumni
Dutch electrical engineers
Academic staff of Erasmus University Rotterdam
Members of the Royal Netherlands Academy of Arts and Sciences
People from Velsen
Royal Netherlands Navy officers